Aníbal Velásquez Hurtado (born June 3, 1936) is a Colombian singer, composer and musician, recognized for playing the accordion. He is also known by his nicknames "El Mago" ("The Magician") and "El Rey de la Guaracha" ("The King of the Guaracha").

Biography 
Aníbal Velásquez was born in 1936 in Barranquilla, Colombia to parents José Antonio Velásquez and Belén Hurtado, and is the brother of the musician José "Cheíto" Velásquez. He is the father of Nelson Velásquez, former member of the vallenato group Los Inquietos del Vallenato.

He had his first hit ("La Gallina") in 1952 as part of the band Los Vallenatos del Magdalena with Carlos and Roberto Román and remained with the band until it disbanded due to Roberto's death. Later, he created his own group with his brothers Juan and José, and with them created a distinctive style of guaracha music with accordion at the beginning of the 1960s; it drew on both Caribbean and South American genres and influences.

Due to the local rise in cartel-associated violent crime, Velásquez moved to Caracas, Venezuela in the 1970s and resided there for 18 years before returning to Barranquilla.

In 2018 Telecaribe, a regional television network for the Caribbean region of Colombia, launched a bio-series as a living tribute to his career, called Aníbal 'Sensación' Velásquez. Over his six-decade-long career, it is estimated Velásquez has recorded over 300 albums and potentially over 500 singles.

In 2019, Velásquez was reported to be seriously sick and was hospitalized in Barranquilla due to a severe lung infection.

References

External links
 Aníbal 'Sensation' Velásquez Telecaribe series website

Living people
1936 births
20th-century accordionists
21st-century accordionists
Colombian accordionists
Colombian composers
20th-century Colombian male singers
Cumbia musicians
People from Barranquilla